Balade, also written Balaide, is a village located in the north of New Caledonia. It was the site of the establishment of a Catholic mission in 1843. A church still exists in the village.

According to New Caledonia Tourism, the bay of Balade is the site where James Cook first visited the island in 1774, as well as where the Bucéphale landed the missionaries in 1843 and where Admiral Auguste Febvrier Despointes disembarked from the ship Le Phoque to take possession of New Caledonia for France in the name of Napoleon III on 24 September 1853.

References 

Populated places in New Caledonia